WBKE may refer to:

 WBKE (AM), a radio station (1490 AM) licensed to serve Fairmont, West Virginia, United States
 WBKE-FM, a radio station (89.5 FM) licensed to serve North Manchester, Indiana, United States
 Telupid Airport, in Telupid, Sabah, Malaysia (ICAO code WBKE)